Porcupine Bank is an area of the Irish shelf, on the fringes of the Atlantic Ocean approximately  west of Ireland. The relatively raised area of seabed, 200 m below sea level at its highest, lies between the deep-water Porcupine Seabight and Rockall Trough.

The name comes from the bank's discovery in 1862 by HMS Porcupine, a British sail and paddle-wheel ship used mainly for surveying.

The northern and western slopes of the bank feature species of cold-water corals.

According to Dr. Anthony Grehan of the National University of Ireland, Galway, the virtually untouched site could benefit dwindling fish stocks and possibly aid medical research.

In an 1870 paper presented to the Geological Society of Ireland, Mr W Fraser suggested that these reefs mark the site of the sunken island of Hy-Brasil.

References 

Undersea banks of the Atlantic Ocean